Kierran Moseley (born 14 May 1994) is an Australian professional rugby league footballer who played for the Gold Coast Titans and Penrith Panthers in the National Rugby League.

Background
Born in Cloncurry, Queensland, Moseley is an Indigenous Australian and played his junior rugby league for the Cloncurry Bulls, before moving to Townsville to further his rugby league career. After being spotted by Penrith Panthers' NYC coach Garth Brennan, Moseley joined the Panthers.

Playing career

Early career
In 2013 and 2014, Moseley played for the Penrith Panthers' NYC team. On 20 April 2013, he played for the Queensland Under-20s team. On 6 October 2013, he played in the Panthers' 2013 NYC Grand Final win over the New Zealand Warriors. On 13 October 2013, he played for the Junior Kangaroos against the Junior Kiwis. On 3 May 2014, he again played for the Queensland Under-20s team.

2014
In round 25 of the 2014 NRL season, Moseley made his NRL debut for the Panthers against the Manly Warringah Sea Eagles. On 17 November 2014, he signed a two-year contract with the Gold Coast Titans starting in 2015.

2015
On 13 February 2015, Moseley played for the Indigenous All Stars against the NRL All Stars in the annual All Stars match. In round 1 of the 2015 NRL season, he made his Titans debut against the Wests Tigers.

References

External links
Gold Coast Titans profile
NRL profile

1994 births
Living people
Australian rugby league players
Gold Coast Titans players
Indigenous All Stars players
Indigenous Australian rugby league players
Junior Kangaroos players
Penrith Panthers players
People educated at Kirwan State High School
Rugby league hookers
Rugby league players from Queensland
Tweed Heads Seagulls players